U-Control can refer to:
 "U-Control",  Universal Studios own HDi Interactive Format template for the interactive technology used in HD DVD movies, later ported to the BD-J format for use in Blu-ray movies.
 Control line (also called "U-Control" in some countries), a way for an operator for controlling a flying model aircraft via pair of wires from the ground.